Dolmatovo is a rural locality (a village) in Gorodetskoye Rural Settlement, Kichmengsko-Gorodetsky District, Vologda Oblast, Russia. The population was 20 as of 2002.

Geography 
Dolmatovo is located 37 km southwest of Kichmengsky Gorodok (the district's administrative centre) by road. Korkin Dor is the nearest rural locality.

References 

Rural localities in Kichmengsko-Gorodetsky District